A person of exceptional merit, a non-United States citizen, may be declared an honorary citizen of the United States by an Act of Congress or by a proclamation issued by the president of the United States, pursuant to authorization granted by Congress.

Eight people have been so honored, six posthumously, and two, Sir Winston Churchill and Mother Teresa, during their lifetimes.

Recipients 

 For Lafayette and Mother Teresa, the honor was proclaimed directly by an Act of Congress. In the other cases, an Act of Congress was passed authorizing the President to grant honorary citizenship by proclamation.

Legal issues
What rights and privileges honorary citizenship bestows, if any, is unclear. According to State Department documents, it does not grant eligibility for United States passports.

Despite widespread belief that Lafayette received honorary citizenship of the United States before Churchill, he did not receive honorary citizenship until 2002. Lafayette did become a natural-born citizen during his lifetime. On December 28, 1784, the Maryland General Assembly passed a resolution stating that Lafayette and his male heirs "forever shall be...natural born Citizens" of the state. This made him a natural-born citizen of the United States under the Articles of Confederation and as defined in Section 1 of Article Two of the United States Constitution.

Lafayette boasted in 1792 that he had become an American citizen before the French Revolution created the concept of French citizenship. In 1803, President Thomas Jefferson wrote him he would have offered to make him Governor of Louisiana, had he been "on the spot". In 1932, descendant René de Chambrun established his American citizenship based on the Maryland resolution, although he was probably ineligible as the inherited citizenship was likely only intended for direct descendants who were heir to Lafayette's estate and title. The Board of Immigration Appeals ruled in 1955 that "it is possible to argue" that Lafayette and living male heirs became American citizens when the Constitution became effective on March 4, 1789, but that heirs born later were not U.S. citizens.

Honorary citizenship should not be confused with citizenship or permanent residency bestowed by a private bill. Private bills are, on rare occasions, used to provide relief to individuals, often in immigration cases, and are also passed by Congress and signed into law by the president. One such statute, granting Elián González U.S. citizenship, was suggested in 1999, but was never enacted.

See also
 Citizenship
 Citizenship of the United States
 Honorary Canadian citizenship

References

External links
 Public Laws granting Honorary Citizenship

United States
+
Citizenship of the United States
1963 establishments in the United States